Sam Hobbs (born 13 May 1988, Brecon) is a Welsh rugby union player. A prop forward, he made his full professional debut for the Cardiff Blues regional team on 9 January 2010 having previously played for Pontypridd RFC.

After six years at the Blues, during which time he made a total of 126 appearances, he was released at the end of the 2015–16 season to sign for the Blues' regional rivals the Dragons. Hobbs played for the Dragons two seasons, before being released at the end of the 2017–18 season after making 36 appearances.

Hobbs is a former Wales Under-19 and Under-20 international. In May 2013 he was selected in the Wales national rugby union team 32-man training squad for the summer 2013 tour to Japan.; however he was not capped on the tour.

He was released by the Dragons regional team at the end of the 2017–18 season.

Personal life 
Sam married Elin, in 2014. They have one daughter and a son together.

References

External links
Dragons profile

1988 births
Living people
Welsh rugby union players
Cardiff Rugby players
Pontypridd RFC players
Dragons RFC players
Rugby union players from Brecon
Rugby union props